Cochabamba (in Hispanicized spelling) or Quchapampa (Quechua qucha lake, pampa a large plain, "lake plain") may refer to:

Geography
Cochabamba, a major city in Bolivia
Cochabamba Department, one of the nine departments that make up Bolivia
Cochabamba Municipality, Bolivia
Cochabamba District, Chota, one of the nineteen districts in Chota Province, Peru
Cochabamba District, Huacaybamba, one of the four districts in Huacaybamba Province, Peru
Cochabamba District, Huaraz, one of the twelve districts in Huaraz District, Peru
Cochabamba Valley, a valley in Bolivia that contains the city of Cochabamba
Cordillera de Cochabamba, a mountain range in Bolivia
Cochapamba Parish, Cotopaxi, in Saquisilí Canton, Cotopaxi Province, Ecuador
Cochapamba Parish, Pichincha, in Quito Canton, Pichincha Province, Ecuador
Quchapampa, Amazonas, an archaeological site in the Amazonas Region, Peru
Quchapampa (Ayacucho), a lake in the Ayacucho Region, Peru
Quchapampa (Lima), a lake in the Lima Region, Peru

Animals
Cochabamba mountain-finch, a finch that is endemic to the Cochabamba Department, Bolivia
Cochabamba grass mouse, a rodent endemic to Bolivia
Colibri de Cochabamba, another name for the wedge-tailed hillstar a hummingbird native to Bolivia and Argentina
Cochabamba (beetle), a genus of beetles in the tribe Luperini

Institutions
Cochabamba Cooperative School an English-language international school located in Cochabamba, Bolivia
Cochabamba Bolivia Temple, the 82nd LDS temple, located in Cochabamba, Bolivia
Cochabamba Cathedral, an 18th-century cathedral in Cochabamba, Bolivia

Miscellaneous
Cochabamba social unrest of 2007 was an event in Bolivian history
Cochabamba-Santa Cruz Highway an important road built in the 1950s with U.S. aid
2000 Cochabamba protests also known as the "Cochabamba Water Wars", were a series of protests that took place in Cochabamba, Bolivia's third largest city, between January and April 2000 because of the privatization of the municipal water supply.